Traulia orientalis is a species of short-horned grasshopper in the family Acrididae. It is found in eastern and southeastern Asia. and

References

External links

 

Catantopinae